Frea sparsilis is a species of beetle in the family Cerambycidae. It was described by Karl Jordan in 1894. It is known from Angola, Gabon, Cameroon, the Republic of the Congo, and the Democratic Republic of the Congo.

References

sparsilis
Beetles described in 1894